Ian MacAulay (born March 25, 1964 in Souris, Prince Edward Island) is a Canadian curler and ice technician from Ottawa, Ontario. He played second for team Ontario at the 2003 Nokia Brier.

Earlier in his career, MacAulay won the 1993 Fairfield Marriott Challenge  and the 1993 Dominion Regalia Silver Tankard. He would later join the Bryan Cochrane rink at second. The team won the 2003 Ontario Nokia Cup, the provincial men's championship. This earned the team the right to play in the 2003 Nokia Brier, where they finished with a 5–6 record.

MacCaulay won the 2016 and 2018 Canadian Senior Curling Championships playing third for Cochrane and won a silver medal at the 2017 World Senior Curling Championships.

Personal life
MacAulay works as the ice technician at the Rideau Curling Club and the RCMP Curling Club. He is married and has three children.

References

External links

Living people
1964 births
Curlers from Ottawa
People from Souris, Prince Edward Island
Canadian male curlers
Curling ice makers
Curlers from Prince Edward Island